The R&F Centre is a 54-storey  office skyscraper, designed by Aedas, on Huaxia Road in Tianhe District of Guangzhou, Guangdong, China. The glass and steel tower is  modeled after a jade vase. Construction began in 2005 and it was completed in 2007.

The R&F Centre is the headquarters of R&F Properties, a Guangzhou-based developer. It is adjacent to the  GZ IFC and the IFP. It is directly opposite Exit B2 of Zhujiang New Town Station. Tenants of the building include several consulates and chambers of commerce.

See also
 List of tallest buildings in the world

References

Skyscraper office buildings in Guangzhou
Office buildings completed in 2007
Tianhe District
Aedas buildings